Local elections were  held in the province of Cebu on May 10, 2010 within the Philippine general election. The voters elected a mayor, vice mayor, nine district representatives (including two from Cebu City and the newly formed lone district of Lapu-Lapu City, and town and city councilors as well as two provincial board members came from six provincial districts.

Results

Partial Unofficial results from COMELEC

Provincial & Congressional Elections 

Each of Cebu's Six and 3 others legislative districts will elect each representative to the House of Representatives. The candidate with the highest number of votes wins the seat.

1st District
Incumbent Eduardo Gullas is also supported by Lakas-Kampi-CMD and its affiliate One Cebu.

2nd District
Pablo Garcia is the incumbent.

3rd District
Pablo John Garcia is the incumbent.

4th District
Celestino Martinez III is the pending incumbent after Benhur Salimbangon was unseated by the Supreme Court due to poll fraud. The case is under a motion for reconsideration. Martinez may not be seated until the last week of January as Congress will adjourn for election-campaigning.

5th District
Incumbent Ramon Durano VI is also co-nominated by One Cebu and Lakas-Kampi-CMD

6th District
Incumbent Nerissa Corazon Soon-Ruiz switched from the Lakas-Kampi-CMD to the Nacionalista Party on March 29, 2010. She is in her third consecutive term already and is ineligible for reelection. She will instead run for Mayor of Mandaue City. Lakas-Kampi-CMD and One Cebu nominated Gabriel Luis Quisumbing as their candidate in this district.

Cebu City

1st District
Incumbent Raul del Mar (Liberal) is in third consecutive term already and is ineligible for reelection. His daughter, Rachel is his party's nominee as well its affiliate Bando Osmeña – Pundok Kauswagan.

2nd District
Incumbent Antonio Cuenco is in third consecutive term already and is ineligible for reelection. He was appointed as Secretary-General of the ASEAN Inter-Parliamentary Assembly (AIPA) on February 4, 2010. Two of his three parties, Lakas-Kampi-CMD and the Probinsya Muna Development Initiative (PROMDI) did not nominate a candidate to run in this district. However, the Kugi Uswag Sugbo (Kusug) nominated businessman Jonathan Guardo as their candidate which is affiliated with the Nacionalista Party.

Cebu City mayor Tomas Osmeña, who is in his third consecutive as mayor and is ineligible for reelection as mayor, is running for Congress under the Liberal Party and its affiliate Bando Osmeña – Pundok Kauswagan.

Lapu-Lapu City

Lapu-Lapu City is going to elect their first congressman this election. They were formerly included in Cebu's 6th district.

Provincial Board elections

City and Municipal elections

References

Elections in Cebu
2010 Philippine local elections